Cha-245 or No. 245 (Japanese: 第二百四十五號驅潜特務艇) was a No.1-class auxiliary submarine chaser of the Imperial Japanese Navy that served during World War II.

History
She was laid down on 23 June 1944 at the Ujiyamada shipyard of Goriki Shipyard Co., Ltd. (強力造船所)(also translated as Kyōryoku Shipyard) and launched on 10 September 1944. She was completed and commissioned on 5 November 1944 at the Kure Naval Arsenal; and assigned to the Sasebo Guard Force. On 15 June 1945, she was assigned to the Shimonoseki Guard Force, 7th Fleet. She survived the war. On 20 December 1945, she was demobilized. 

On 28 August 1947, she was assigned to the Japan Maritime Safety Agency and on 20 August 1948 she was designated a patrol boast  (PS-03) and renamed Manazuru (まなづる).  On 1 May 1954, she was transferred to the newly created Japan Maritime Self-Defense Force and designated PS-123. She was delisted on 20 February 1962.

References

1944 ships
No.1-class auxiliary submarine chasers
Auxiliary ships of the Imperial Japanese Navy